The Great Bend Millers were a minor league baseball team based in Great Bend, Kansas in 1905 and from 1909 to 1914. The Millers played as members of the Class D level Kansas State League in 1905 and from 1909 to 1911, Central Kansas League in 1912 and returned to the Kansas State League in 1913 and 1914. Great Bend won three consecutive league championships from 1911 to 1913.

History
Minor league baseball in Great Bend, Kansas began with the 1905 Great Bend Millers, who began play as charter members of the six–team Class D level Kansas State League, when the league expanded during the season. On July 6, 1905, the Millers and the Lincoln Center team joined the league during the season, expanding the first year league from four to six teams. Great Bend finished the 1905 season with a record of 19–9 to place 2nd, playing the season under managers James Durham and Carl Moore. Great Bend finished 4.5 games behind 1st place Ellsworth in the final standings. The Millers folded following the 1905 season.

The Great Bend use of the "Millers" moniker is likely in reference to the local agriculture industry of the era. Great Bend, Kansas agriculture and grain production remains a predominant local industry.

In 1909, minor league baseball resumed as the Great Bend Millers became members of the reformed eight–team Class D level Kansas State League. The Arkansas City-Winfield Twins, Hutchinson Salt Packers, Lyons Lions, McPherson Merry Macks, Newton Railroaders, Strong City-Cottonwood Falls Twins and Wellington Dukes joined great Bend as 1909 league members.

After resuming minor league play, the Great Bend Millers placed 4th in the Kansas State League standings. Great Bend ended the 1909 season with a record of 49–48, playing under managers Rudy Kling and Stillings in the in Kansas State League play. The Millers finished 11.5 games behind the 1st place Lyons Lions in the final standings.

Continuing play in 1910, the Great Bend Millers placed 5th in the Kansas State League standings. The Great Bend Millers finished the 1910 season with a record of 54–55. The Millers finished 16.0 games behind the 1st place Hutchinson Salt Packers in the final standings. Charles Lyons served as manager in 1910. Rolla Mapel, a Great Bend Millers pitcher led the league with 205 strikeouts.

The 1911 Great Bend Millers won the Kansas State League championship in a shortened season. The league disbanded on July 11, 1911, due to crop failures and drought.On the date the league folded, Great Bend was in 1st place with a 39–20 record behind managers Frank "Affie" Wilson and Wild Bill Luhrsen When the league ceased play, Millers were 0.5 games ahead of the 2nd place Newton Railroaders in the shortened season standings.

The Great Bend Millers switched leagues in 1912 and won a second consecutive championship. Great Bend became members of the six–team Class D level Central Kansas League in 1912. The Millers ended the 1912 season with a 54–36 record to place 1st in the standings, as Affie Wilson returned as manager. Great Bend finished 2.0 games ahead of the 2nd place Manhattan Giants. The Central Kansas League permanently folded following the 1912 season.

In 1913, the Great Bend Millers won their third consecutive championship. Great Bend continued play and joined the six–team Class D level Kansas State League. The Manhattan Giants and Junction City Soldiers folded from the league mid–season. The Millers ended the 1913 season in 1st place with a 53–36 record, again winning a championship under returning manager Affie Wilson. Great Bend finished 1.5 games ahead of the 2nd place Clay Center Cubs. Millers' pitcher Elmer Brown had 18 wins to lead the league.

The Great Bend Millers finished last and permanently folded after the 1914 season, after relocating in the final week of play. The Kansas State League reduced teams and played as a four–team league in its final season in 1914. Great Bend placed 4th under Affie Wilson, with a record of 35–54. On August 10, 1914, the franchise moved to Minneapolis, Kansas for last three games of season as the Kansas State League permanently folded following the season.

Affie Wilson, who managed Great Bend for four seasons, was by noted by researchers to have deep roots in Kansas baseball and great skill in developing young baseball players. Wilson was reportedly greatly respected by both home and visiting players and fans. After managing the Great Bend Millers to their third consecutive championship in 1913, Affie Wilson was given a diamond ring by local boosters.

Great Bend, Kansas was without minor league play until 2016, when the Great Bend Boom played as members of the Independent level Pecos League.

The ballparks
In 1905, the Great Bend Millers played home games at the Fairgrounds. The Fairgrounds were located on the East side of Great Bend, Kansas. Today, the Barton County Fair is still held at the fairgrounds, located at 1800 12th Street, Great Bend, Kansas.

The Great Bend Millers' home minor league ballpark from 1909 to 1914 was League Park. The ballpark was also known as East Side Park, Athletic Park and Sportsman's Park. The ballpark was located at Frey Street & Lakin Street, Great Bend, Kansas.

Timeline

Year–by–year records

Notable alumni

James Durham (1905, MGR)
George Kaiserling (1910)
Rudy Kling (1909, MGR)
Wild Bill Luhrsen (1910), (1911, MGR)
Rolla Mapel (1909-1910)
Ovid Nicholson (1910, 1912)
Harry Patton (1909)
Bill Rumler (1913)
Farmer Weaver (1910)

See also
Great Bend Millers players

References

External links
Baseball Reference

Defunct minor league baseball teams
Defunct baseball teams in Kansas
Baseball teams disestablished in 1905
Baseball teams established in 1914
Kansas State League teams
Central Kansas League teams
Barton County, Kansas